Catocala mira, the wonderful underwing, is a moth of the family Erebidae. The species was first described by Augustus Radcliffe Grote in 1876. It is found in North America from Manitoba through southern Ontario and Quebec through New Hampshire and Connecticut to Florida, west to Texas and north through Iowa and Illinois.

Its wingspan is 40–50 mm. Adults are on wing from July to August. There is probably one generation per year.

The larvae feed on Crataegus.

References

External links
Species info

Moths described in 1876
mira
Moths of North America